Amber An, born Liao Ching-ling, is a Taiwanese actress, singer, television host, and model.

Career

Amber An entered the showbiz in February 2009 through television program Celebrity Imitated Show: The Largest Political Party, in which she impersonates other celebrities, most prominently singer Kuo Shu-yao. In 2011, An was voted the world's sexiest woman in the Taiwanese version of magazine FHM. She released her first album in August 2011. Later that year, she signed a NT$1 million ($42,500) contract with Reebok to become the brand's Taiwanese ambassador.

After a year and half in the making, An released her second album in January 2013. In 2014, she was a Taiwan Fund for Children and Families's Child Protection Ambassador. Her third album was released in September 2014. In it, she tried to focus more on "arts rhythm of the steps of a dance" in order to show a varied aspect of hers in terms of style of music and her appearance.

Discography

Studio albums

Filmography

Television series

Film

Variety show

Music video

Theater

Awards and nominations

References

External links

 

1985 births
Living people
Actresses from Taichung
21st-century Taiwanese actresses
21st-century Taiwanese singers
Taiwanese Buddhists
Taiwanese female models
Taiwanese film actresses
Taiwanese television actresses
Taiwanese television presenters
21st-century Taiwanese women singers
Taiwanese women television presenters
Musicians from Taichung